The Mufaddaliyyat (Arabic: المفضليات / ALA-LC: al-Mufaḍḍaliyāt), meaning "The Examination of al-Mufaḍḍal", is an anthology of ancient Arabic poems which derives its name from its author Mufaḍḍal al-Ḍabbī, who compiled it some time between 762 and his death in 784 CE. It contains 126 poems, some complete odes, others fragmentary. They are all of the Golden Age of Arabic poetry (500—650) and are considered to be the best choices of poems from that period by different authors. There are 68 authors, two of whom were Christian. The oldest poems in the collection date from about 500 CE. The collection is a valuable source concerning pre-Islamic Arab life.

The Mufaḍḍaliyāt is one of five canonical primary sources of early Arabic poetry.   The four others are Mu'allaqat, Hamasah, Jamharat Ash'ar al-Arab and the Asma'iyyat.

The Collection
The collection contains 126 long and short pieces of verse in its present form.  This number is included in the recension of al-Anbari, who received the text from Abu 'Ikrima of Dabba, who read it with Ibn al-A‘rābī, al-Mufaḍḍal's stepson and inheritor of the tradition. We know from the Fihrist of Ibn al-Nadim (d. ca. 988 AD) that the original book, as transmitted by Ibn al-A‘rābī, contained 128 pieces and began with the poet Ta’abbaṭa Sharran Thābit ibn Jābir; this number agrees with the Vienna manuscript, which includes an additional poem, poems annotated by al-Anbari, al-Muraqqish the Elder, etc., and a poem by al-Harith ibn Hilliza. The Fihrist states (p. 68) that some scholars included more and others fewer poems, while the order of the poems in the several recensions differed. It is noticeable that this traditional text, and the accompanying scholia, as represented by al-Anbari's recension, derive from al-Mufaddal's fellow philolgists of the Kufan school.  Sources from the rival school of Basra claimed however that al-Mufaddal's original dīwān ('collection') was a much smaller volume of poems. In his commentary (Berlin MS), Ahmad ibn Muhammad al-Marzuqi gives the number of original poems as thirty, or eighty in a clearer passage,; and mentions too, that al-Asma'i and his Basran grammarians, augmented this to a hundred and twenty. This tradition, ascribed by al-Marzuqi and his teacher Abu Ali al-Farisi to Abu 'Ikrima of Dabba, who al-Anbari represented as the transmitter of the integral text from Ibn al-A'rabi, gets no mention by al-Anbari, and it would seem improbable as the two schools of Basrah and Kufah were in sharp competition. Ibn al-A'rabi in particular was in the habit of censuring al-Asma'i's interpretations of the ancient poems. It is scarcely likely that he would have accepted his rivals' additions to the work of his stepfather, and handed them on to Abu 'Ikrima with his annotations.

The collection is a record of the highest importance of the thought and poetic art of Pre-Islamic Arabia in the immediate period before the appearance of the Prophet Muhammad.  The great majority belonged to the days of Jahiliyyah ('Ignorance')no more than five or six of the 126 poems appear to have been by Islamic era poetsand though a number of Jahiliyyah-born poets had adopted Islam (e.g. Mutammim ibn Nuwayrah, Rabi'a ibn Maqrum, Abda ibn at-Tabib and Abu Dhu'ayb), their work bears few marks of the new faith.  While  ancient themes of virtue; hospitality to the guest and the poor, extravagance of wealth, valour in battle, tribal loyalty, are  praised yet other practices forbidden in IslamWine, gambling (the game of maisir), etc.,are all celebrated by poets professing adherence to the faith. Neither the old idolatry nor the new spirituality are themes. 
Mufaḍḍal al-Ḍabbī gathers works by 68 poets in 126 pieces. Little of these poets, known as al-Muqillun, survives, unlike those poets whose diwans have ensured their enduring fame. Yet many pieces selected by al-Mufaddal  are celebrated.  Several, such as 'Alqama ibn 'Abada's two long poems (Nos. 119 and 120), Mutammim ibn Nuwayrah's three odes  (Nos. 9, 67, 68), Salama ibn Jandal splendid poem  (No. 22), al-Shanfara's beautiful nasib (opening theme, or prologue) (No. 20), and Abd-Yaghuth's death-song  (No. 30), reach a high degree of excellence. The last of the series, a long elegy  (No. 126) by Abu Dhu'ayb al-Hudhail on the death of his sons is one of the most admired; almost every verse of this poem is cited in illustration of some phrase or meaning of a word in the national Arabic lexicons.  Al-Harith ibn Hilliza is the only poet included also in the Mu'allaqat.  Although diwans (poetry collections) by early poets survive; e.g., Bishr ibn Abi Khazim, al-Hadira, Amir ibn al-Tufail, 'Alqama ibn 'Abada, al-Muthaqqib, Ta'abbata Sharran and Abu Dhu'ayb), it is unclear how many were compiled before al-Mufaddal's anthology of forty-eight pre-Islamic and twenty Islamic-era poets.

The uncle and nephew, called al-Muraqqish, were two poets of the Bakr bin Wa'il tribe and are perhaps the most ancient in the collection. The elder Muraqqish was the great-uncle of Tarafa of Bakr, the author of the Mu'allaqat, and took part in the long warfare between the sister tribes of Bakr and Taghlib, called the "War of Basus", which began about the end of the 5th century CE. Al-Mufaḍḍal includes ten of his pieces (Nos. 45–54), interesting chiefly from an antiquarian point of view.  No. 54 in particular appears very archaic and the compiler probably gathered all the available work of this ancient author, based on his antiquity. Of the younger Muraqqish, uncle of Tarafa, there are five pieces (Nos. 55–59). The only other authors of whom more than three poems are cited are Bishr ibn Abi Khazim of Asad (Nos. 96–99) and Rabi'a ibn Maqrum of Dabba (Nos. 38, 39, 43 and 113).

The Mufaddaliyat, as an anthology of complete qasidas (odes), differs from the Hamasah, which comprises passages selected for brilliance, with the prosaic edited. Many poems in the Mufaddaliyat are fragments or incomplete, and even the longest have many lacunae.  Mufaḍḍal al-Ḍabbī evidently strove to preserve the oral heritage in the poetic material memorized by the rawis.  He selects the best from oral-literary tradition and more comprehensively preserves material representative  and characteristic of his age, unlike that appearing in the Hamasah by the brilliant Abu Tammam.

Al-Mufaḍḍaliyyāt Editions
Die Mufaḍḍaliyyāt, ed. H. Thorbecke. 1. Heft (Leipzig 1885). Heinrich Thorbecke based this edition on the text of the Berlin Codex, He began this work in 1885 but had only completed the first fasciculus, with forty-two poems, when he died.
 al-Mufaḍḍaliyyāt Vol.I  text, with short commentary from al-Anbari (Constantinople 1891).
al-Mufaḍḍaliyyāt, ed., Abū Bakr b. ʿU. Dag̲h̲istānī (Cairo 1324/1906).; complete text, with short glosses from al-Anbari's commentary; based generally on the Cairo codex (See above), with references to Thorbecke's scholarly  edition in the first half of the work.
The Mufaḍḍaliyyāt, an anthology of ancient Arabic odes (Oxford 1921), ed. C.J. Lyall; complete edition of al-Anbārī's text and commentary;  poems translated by Charles James Lyall: i, Arabic text; ii, Translation and notes (Oxford 1918); iii, Indexes to the Arabic text, compiled by A. A. Bevan (London 1924), paralleled by his Arabic-language edition: Dīwān al-Mufaḍḍaliyāt: wa-hiya nukhbah min qaṣāʼid al-shuʻarāʼ al-muqallīn fī al-Jāhilīyah wa-awāʼil al-Islām, ed. by Kārlūs Yaʻqūb Lāyil (Bayrūt: Maṭbaʻat al-Ābāʼ al-Yasūʻiyyīn, 1920).
 al-Mufaḍḍaliyyāt, ed., Ahmad Mohammad Shakir; Abdassalam Mohammad Hârun, Cairo, Dar al-Ma`ârif 1942.
S̲h̲arḥ Ik̲h̲tiyārāt al-Muf, ed. F. Ḳabāwā, i-ii (Damascus 1388-91/1968-71); containing 59 poems and commentary by al-Tibrīzī.
S̲h̲arḥ al-Mufaḍḍaliyyāt, ed. A.M. al-Bid̲j̲āwī, i-iii (Cairo 1977).

See also

Hamasah
Kitab al-Aghani
Mu'allaqat

References

Sources

Notes

External links
The Mufaddaliyat at Forgotten Books

8th-century Arabic books
8th-century works
8th-century poems
Arabic anthologies
Medieval Arabic poems